Moores Bridge, also spelled Moors Bridge, is an unincorporated community in Tuscaloosa County, Alabama, United States.

History
Moores Bridge is named for the bridge built by Duncan Taney Moore over the Sipsey River. A post office operated under the name Moores Bridge from 1853 to 1966.

Notable person
 James Jefferson Mayfield, Associate Justice of the Alabama Supreme Court from 1908 to 1920

References

Unincorporated communities in Tuscaloosa County, Alabama
Unincorporated communities in Alabama